General elections were held in Thailand on 13 September 1992. They were the first elections after Black May and the end of the military dictatorship by the National Peace Keeping Council. Voter turnout was 62%.

The Democrat Party emerged as the largest in parliament, winning 79 of the 360 seats. The Democrat Party subsequently formed a coalition government with the New Aspiration Party, the Palang Dharma Party, the Solidarity Party and the Social Action Party.

The central election committee used the motto "Sell your voice, sell your rights, like selling your life, treason".

Results

References

Thailand
General
1992 09